The Djaru people are an Aboriginal Australian people of the southern Kimberley region of Western Australia.

Language
Djaru is a member of the Ngumbin language family, and is related to Walmajarri.

Country
The Djaru people ranged along Margaret River as far as the Mary River Junction. Their land took in the headwaters of Christmas Creek, ran eastward to Cummins Range, Sturt Creek Station up to the border with the Northern Territory. Its northern boundary lay in the vicinity of the Nicholson Station homestead, and the headwaters of the Ord River above the Dixon Range, and including the areas east of Alice Downs as far as Hall's Creek and the Margaret River gorge. In Norman Tindale's estimation the total land range encompassed something like . The area is now known as the Kutjungka Region.

Trade
The Djaru, like the Gija, much admired the composite spears, fitted with barbed pegs, of their southern neighbours, fashioned from mulga hardwood and witjuti bush shrubs and to obtain them would exchange them for stone knives and pressure-flaked spear blades (tjimbala), and pearl shells which filtered down from the coast where they had been collected by the distant Jawi.

History of contact
Massacres of Aboriginals in the Kimberleys were commonplace as the land was cleared for settlement and pastoral stations. An early massacre at Hangman's Creek, otherwise undocumented in colonial archives, remains undated but is associated with the name of Sergeant Richard Henry Pilmer.

Djaru had been responsible for killing in separate incidents four outsiders, a stockman, a surveyor, a miner, and a Chinaman at Ruby Plains Station. Native tradition holds that Pilmer rode out in a buggy and rounded up a mob of Djaru to get them to dig a 'well'. Once that work was completed, he then strung them all up on a walarri gum tree and buried them in the well. The place thereby earned the name of Hangman's Creek. The primary victims of that particular slaughter were, according to Norman Tindale, the Margaret River Djaru.

In September 1922, two settlers, Joseph Condren and Tim O'Sullivan, were murdered at Billiluna homestead. According to one account, a Guluwaring man Goose Hill near Kununurra, known as Banjo, seized a gun and shot first Sullivan, and then Condren, while the latter two were branding cattle with the assistance of several natives. The reason given for the murder was Banjo acting to revenge himself on Sullivan who had taken away his wife, Topsy. The other blacks, who tried to intervene, were held at bay by Banjo, who threatened them with the rifle.

According to indigenous traditions, the first massacre that ensued in retaliation for the killings took place at Kaningarra between wells 48 and 49 on the Canning Stock Route. The incident is undocumented and relies on the testimony of the three sons of Riwarri, the only adult survivor. In this account, a police punitive expedition came across an encampment in which Aboriginals were cooking camel meat, and they kept shooting into it until they ran short of ammunition. Those who survived were led off tethered by neckchains to a site called the 'Goat Yard' at Denison Downs. A police party, led by Constable J.J. Cooney, engaged ostensibly in a search for the culprit, was in the Walmajarri area from 12 to 31 October at the time of the reported slaughter.

The second incident, soon afterward, took place at the former Denison Downs homestead on the Sturt Creek Station, in a site referred to as Chuall Pool where many Djaru, together with Walmajarri, were murdered. The victims were the survivors of the Kaningarra massacre. A recent archaeological study of two sites, identified by the tribal custodians, as the goat yard and the women and children's site, turned up ample evidence of calcinated bone fragments that were the residue of exposure to prolonged extreme heat, which was created by a fire accelerant like kerosene wholly atypical of hunter-gatherer hearths. On the other hand, the 'well-digging' story, it was inferred, cannot have been accurate since the indicated well had been constructed before then. Otherwise, the archaeological study confirmed the likelihood that police had massacred an unknown number of Aboriginals at this second site.

Alternative names
 Charrau
 Deharu
 Djara (? misprint)
 Djaro
 Jarroo, Jarrou, Jarrau
 Jaruo
 Jaruru
 Ka:biri.(Margaret River group)
 Karbery
 Kodjangana (northern Djaru)
 Njining, Njinin, Nyinin, Nining, Neening.(language name)
 Ruby Creek tribe

Source:

Some words
 jaji (kangaroo).

Notes

Citations

Sources

Aboriginal peoples of Western Australia